Adil al-Kalbani is a Saudi Arabian Muslim cleric of Afro-Saudi background who served as the Imam of the Great Mosque of Mecca.

Biography

Early years and studies
Adil al-Kalbani was born in Riyadh on April 4, 1958 to poor emigrants from Ras Al Khaimah in the United Arab Emirates who came to Saudi Arabia in the 1950s. His father used to work as a government clerk. Due to his family's financial situation, al-Kalbani took a job with Saudi Arabian Airlines after finishing high school, whilst attending evening classes at King Saud University.

Al-Kalbani's first teacher in his further Islamic studies was Hasan ibn Gaanim al-Gaanim. He studied Sahih al-Bukhari, Jami` at-Tirmidhi and the tafsir of Ibn Kathir with him. He also studied with Mustafa Muslim who taught the tafsir of al-Baydawi at Imam Muhammad ibn Saud Islamic University.  He also studied Akhir Tadmariyah with Abdullah Ibn Jibreen and the Quran with Ahmad Mustafa. In 1994, he passed the government exam to become an Imam.

Career as Imam
After a brief stint working at the mosque in Riyadh Airport, he moved on to working as an Imam at the more prominent King Khalid Mosque. He once dreamed that he had become the imam at the Great Mosque of Mecca; two years later, in 2008, he was selected by King Abdullah to lead the tarawih prayers at the mosque.

In Japan's city of Bandu, a center of Minhaj-ul-Quran was visited by Al-Kalbani on June 30, 2013. 

Al-Kalbani has said he is not a Shaykh (an authority in religious matters) but a Qari.

Personal life
He has two wives and twelve children.

Views

Church bells
In a tweet, al-Kalbani stated that the non-existence of church bells in Saudi Arabia pleased him.

Mecca crane collapse
Al-Kalbani criticised a tweet from a Saudi poet that said that the cranes that collapsed in Mecca "fell to the ground in prayer". Al-Kalbani said that this was the "stupidest kind of nonsense". He sarcastically suggested that the other cranes did not collapse because they were "liberal".

Salafism
Al-Kalbani stated that Salafism is a source of ISIL ideology.

Segregation of men and women 
He criticised the current situation of gender segregation in mosques, where women are "completely isolated" from men and only connected via a microphone. He called this a "phobia of women".

Shias
In an interview with the BBC, al-Kalbani declared Twelver Shias as apostates, which triggered a backlash from followers of the sect in Saudi Arabia. In 2019, however, he retracted his position after reading a book by fellow scholar Hatim al-Awni, stating that he no longer considers as apostates those who "believe in one God, eat our [halal] meat, and prostrate toward our Qibla [direction of Mecca]".

Stance on musical instruments
In a fatwa, al-Kalbani considered singing to be permissible under Islamic law, but retracted it in 2010. In 2019, he backtracked on his retraction and again considered it permissible. A religious singing event was attended by al-Kalbani. A flute was purportedly used.

Filmography
In November 2021 he appeared in a promotional video for Combat Field - Riyadh Season 2021.

References

External links

https://www.youtube.com/watch?v=bGt2ZTGaApQ

Living people
1959 births
Saudi Arabian Quran reciters
Muslim scholars of Islamic jurisprudence
Arab people of African descent
King Saud University alumni
Critics of Shia Islam
People from Riyadh
Saudi Arabian Islamic religious leaders
Sunni imams
Saudi Arabian Sunni Muslim scholars of Islam
Saudi Arabian people of African descent
Saudi Arabian Salafis
Saudi Arabian imams
20th-century imams
21st-century imams
Saudi Arabian people of Emirati descent